Kabare Territory is a territory in South Kivu, Democratic Republic of the Congo, on the western side of Lake Kivu.

Kabare Territory is the home region of the Shi people.It is the capital of Bushi Kingdom, located in the South Kivu Province, Eastern Congo. The King of this Chiefdom is Mwami Kabare Nnabushi.

History
Kabare Territory was the central part of the former Bushi Kingdom between the Mitumba Mountains and Lake Kivu.
People of Kabare Territory are Bashi or Shi people, speaking Mashi or Shi language. They are mainly farmers and small business entrepreneurs.

Geography
Kabare Territory is located in the far eastern Congo on the western shores of Lake Kivu. Part of Kahuzi-Biéga National Park is located in Kabare Territory.

Kabare Territory borders the country of Rwanda to the east, across Lake Kivu. It borders the territories of Kalehe in the north; Shabunda in the west, Walungu in the south, and Idjwi (an island in the middle of the Lake Kivu) also to the east.

Notes and references

Territories of South Kivu Province